WYTK (93.9 FM) is a radio station broadcasting a sports format. Licensed to Rogersville, Alabama, United States, the station serves the Florence-Muscle Shoals area.  The station is owned by Gregory H. Thornton, through licensee Valley Broadcasting, Inc., and features programming from ESPN Radio and CBS Radio.

The station is an affiliate of the Atlanta Braves radio network.

References

External links

YTK
ESPN Radio stations
Radio stations established in 1994
1994 establishments in Alabama